Thierry Moutoussamy (born 23 December 1972), better known as Lord Kossity, is a French musician. His family is originally from Martinique but he was born in Paris, France and moved back to the French West Indies with his family when he was 11 years old. He began his career in the 1990s with the group Contrast, with his cousin, Dr G-Kill. He started incorporating ragga music with the zouk style later in the 1990s, and has since recorded a number of albums and collaborated with Suprême N.T.M., Vybz Kartel, Shaggy, Bounty Killer, Snoop Dogg, Ice Cube and Elephant Man.

Discography
Studio albums
 An tèt ou sa yé ! (1997) (released only in the French West Indies and reedited in 1998 in metropolitan France under the name L.K. 1: VersaStyle)
 Everlord (2000)
 The Real Don (2001)
 Koss City (2002)
 El Indio (2003) (released only in the French West Indies)
 Booming System (2005)
 Danger Zone (2006)
 K.O.S.S. (2008)
 K.O.S.S. 02 (2010)
 Fully Loaded (2010)
 Fully Loaded 2 (2013)
 Fully Loaded 2.5 (2013)

Extended plays
 One Man Show (1996)

'Compilation albums
 Dancehall Party: Silence (1993) (released only in the French West Indies)
 V.I.P.: Aye chechey (1995) (released only in the French West Indies)
 Phénoménal (1999)
 Top Shotta (1999)
 Le Best Of (2009)Singles'''
 "Vanessa" (1993)
 "Sa rivew'" (1995)
 "Sound Boy Watch It" (1998)
 "Ma Benz" (Suprême N.T.M. featuring Lord Kossity) (1998)
 "Morenas" (2000)
 "Sexe dans la piscine" (2000)
 "Hey Sexy Wow" (featuring Chico) (2005)
 "Dancehall Soldiers" (featuring Krys and Daddy Mory) (2005)
 "Oh No (Judgment Day)" (featuring Kool Shen) (2006)
 "Balance Gal" (featuring Don Capelli) (2006)
 "Booty Call" (featuring Chico) (2006)
 "J'aime" (featuring Clara Morgane) (2007)
 "Hotel Room" (featuring Chico and Nicky B.) (2007)
 "Le respect ne s'achète pas" (featuring Supa John) (2008)
 "So Sexy" (featuring Red Rat and Speedy) (2009)
 "Champion Sound" (2009)
 "Wath love" Remix featuring Shaggy and Akon (2009)
 "Politiquement incorrect" (2010)
 "Roule avec moi" (2010)
 "Sexy Boom Boom" (2011)

References

External links
 Official website 
 Discography

1972 births
Living people
Musicians from Paris
French people of Martiniquais descent
French rappers
Dancehall musicians
Martiniquais musicians